The Lottery Man is a 1916 American silent comedy film featuring Oliver Hardy and produced at the Whartons Studio in Ithaca, New York. A print of the film exists in the film archive of the Library of Congress.

Plot

Cast
 Thurlow Bergen as Jack Wright-a son
 Elsie Esmond as Miss Helen Heyer-foxeys cousin
 Carolyn Lee as Lizzie Roberts-Mrs Peytons pet goat
 Allan Murnane as Foxey Peyton-his chum
 Lottie Alter as Mrs. Wright-little mother
 Ethel Winthrop as Mrs. Peyton-foxey's mother
 Mary Leslie Mayo as Hedgwig Jensen-physical instructor
 F.W. Stewart as Mcquire the newspaper publisher and the local constable
 Oliver Hardy as Maggie Murphy
 Edward O'Connor as The Butler
 Malcolm Head as Vegetable cart man in accident
 Louis A. Fuertes as Lottery drawing host
 Clarence Merrick as Chauffeur
 Joseph Urband as Newspaper workroom clerk
 Frances White as Mrs. Peyton's maid

See also
 List of American films of 1916
 Oliver Hardy filmography

References

External links

1916 films
1916 short films
1916 comedy films
Silent American comedy films
American silent short films
American black-and-white films
American comedy short films
Films directed by Leopold Wharton
Films directed by Theodore Wharton
1910s American films